Sugar & Spice is the fifth studio album by American singer Mya. It was released by Manhattan Recordings exclusively in Japan on December 3, 2008. The album was produced through Mya's own independent label imprint Planet 9 following her departure from Universal Motown amid the leakage of her previous album Liberation on the Japanese music market. Rather than spending time in court suing Motown/Universal, she opted out of her contract. Mya was then approached to record more albums exclusively for the Japanese market because of the reaction there to Liberation.

Recorded between the months of September and November 2008 at Mya's own recording studio, production was primary handled by a variety of low-profile producers; enlisting the help of Arkatech Beatz, Riddim Fingaz, The Smith Bros, and Duke Williams among others. Harrison, took full creative control co-writing the entire album with producer Christopher Moore and served as executive producer. Guest features included rappers Tre, Faith Boogie, and dancehall musician Sean Paul. In her own words, Mya described the album as "a compilation with all positive energy and song content."
 
The album spawned just one single, the riddim-inspired "Paradise", which was released on October 31, 2008. Sugar & Spice debuted at number fifty-three on Japan's Oricon Albums Chart.

Background
In 2007 Mya's fourth studio album Liberation was accidentally released in Japan when the release date changed. At the time, she was with Motown/Universal and her lawyer advised that she not waste time and money taking the issue to court, so Harrison decided to go independent instead. The Liberation album became so popular in Japan that Manhattan Recordings approached her about doing business with them. Harrison then released her first independent project, Sugar & Spice, a year after her split with Motown in Japan in 2008.

Planet 9
In 2008, Harrison created her own label imprint Planet 9. Since parting ways with Universal Motown, Harrison has released four independently self-funded, self-executive produced projects; 2008's Sugar & Spice, 2009's Sugar & Spice: The Perfect Edition, 2010's Beauty & the Streets Vol. 1 and 2011's K.I.S.S. In 2009, Harrison spoke with Rolling Out magazine, elaborating more on her hiatus from music and decision to go independent:

"I've never stopped doing music. I've created a label called Planet 9 and I released an album in Japan. I invested in my own studio and it cut the recording cost down 95 percent. I have my own in-house producers and they are not as expensive as an established producer. The return is greater and now I own my masters. I see six dollars per album sold versus 10 cents. You may not sell as many units because you don't put as much money in promotions, but the returns are better."

Later in the interview, Harrison voiced her opinion on the major difference between major record labels and independent labels, saying with "Major labels have a system that you have to go through. The people in power dictate how things should sound and where the money is spent. But when you become your own boss, you check every line item and you have to be cautious."

Development
Unlike her first four studio albums, which were financed by major record labels, Sugar & Spice was solely self-funded and self-produced in Mya's home studio in her hometown of Washington D.C. After signing an exclusive recording contract with Manhattan Recordings, Harrison began production for the album in September 2008. Unfamiliar with the independent route and to keep recording cost down as much as possible, Harrison opted to work with a variety of less known producers to create Sugar & Spice. In search of new producers, while at a Guitar Center in Los Angeles buying equipment Mya met reggae producer Chris "Riddim Fingaz" Garvey's brother and got his phone number. Aware of his great production skills, Mya reluctantly called him, collaborated and produced "Paradise", a riddim-inspired song. Of his contribution to Sugar & Spice, Harrison commented, "Riddim Fingaz has a great presence and is a great talent."

Continuing production on Sugar & Spice, Harrison reached out to Yonni, a young producer from Cleveland, Ohio with whom she met through MySpace. Prior to the leakage of her fourth studio album Liberation, Yonni had produced a remix version of Harrison's single "Ridin'". Impressed with his production skills, Harrison and Yonni continued to work together and maintain a professional relationship. Additionally, Harrison sought out UK singer, songwriter and producer Stevie Hoang for contribution to Sugar & Spice as well. With 14 tracks in total, in an article commenting on the finished results, Sugar & Spice was described as a lineup of songs that stimulate the Japanese quintessence that set apart from her previous albums and dubbed musically as her most wonderful work to date.

Music and composition
Musically, Sugar & Spice contains melodic songs based on the pop genre that compliments Mya's vocals. Commenting on the album's theme, Mya explained, "There's a saying, "A life with sugar (sweetness) and spices (stimulation) is wonderful." Girls need sugar and spices, while noting, "This album has a little bit of sugar and a little spice, so you can get to know the two sides of Mýa." Sugar & Spice opens with the '80s pop-inspired "Must Be the Music". It followed by the Riddim Fingaz-produced "Paradise". A riddim song, "Paradise" was chosen as the album's first single after a listening sessions with fans. Track six, the ballad "Cry No More", was described as a "very passionate" song, while mid-tempo "Ego Trippin'" addresses a situation in which Harrison admits that she was wrong. "Shy Guy", a cover of Diana King's hit served as the album's tenth track. When asked why she chose to cover the song, Harrison responded, "It was my favorite song when I was young. I was in reggae mode, so I wanted to add that kind of flavor, while pointing out, "It's a really fun song, it's a bit like sugar and spice." "Back to Disco" the album's twelfth track incorporates element of 70s music.

Release and promotion
Following its completion, Sugar & Spice arrived in stores and online December 3, 2008. The following year Manhattan Recordings issued Sugar & Spice: The Perfect Edition, a double disc album that featured a new track, new remixes and past hits within her discography on August 5, 2009.

To promote Sugar & Spice, Manhattan Recordings organized and arranged an album release party at Fever, a popular night club/music venue where Harrison performed for the very first time in Japan. A 40 minute stage show that featured four costumes changes, Mya was accompanied by four dancers and performed new material from Sugar & Spice as well as her past hits which included, "Paradise", "Shy Guy", "Must Be the Music", "Fallen", and "The Best of Me".

Singles
Sugar & Spice spawned the first and only single, "Paradise". Written by Mya and songwriter Christopher Moore, "Paradise" is a riddim-inspired song produced by Riddim Fingaz.  Played during a listening session, fans responded positively and thus "Paradise" was chosen as the lead single. Manhattan Recordings released "Paradise" on October 31, 2008. An accompanying music video followed and was directed by photographer Marc Baptiste.

Track listing

Personnel
Credits adapted from the liner notes of Sugar & Spice.

Visuals and imagery

 Art direction and design – Courtney Walter
 Hair stylist – Frederick Parnell
 Make-up – Aminata Gueye
 Photography – Marc Baptiste
 Stylist – Kithe Brewster

Technical and production

 Engineering – Mya Harrison
 Mastering – Mike Mo
 Mixing – Mike Mo

Chart

Release history

References

2008 albums
Mýa albums